Starks is an unincorporated community and census-designated place (CDP) in Calcasieu Parish, Louisiana, United States. As of the 2010 census it had a population of 664. Starks is known for its annual Mayhaw Festival to celebrate the fruit that grows in the bayous along the Texas/Louisiana border.

Demographics 

As of the 2020 United States census, there were 659 people, 166 households, and 84 families residing in the CDP.

References

External links
Mayhaw Festival

Census-designated places in Louisiana
Census-designated places in Lake Charles metropolitan area
Census-designated places in Calcasieu Parish, Louisiana